Lake View is a plantation in Piscataquis County, Maine, United States. The population was 150 at the 2020 census.

Geography

Demographics

At the 2000 census, there were 43 people, 25 households and 12 families residing in the plantation. The population density was 1.0 per square mile (0.4/km2). There were 425 housing units at an average density of 10.2 per square mile (4.0/km2). The racial makeup of the plantation was 97.67% White, and 2.33% from two or more races.

There were 25 households, of which 4.0% had children under the age of 18 living with them, 48.0% were married couples living together, and 52.0% were non-families. 40.0% of all households were made up of individuals, and 16.0% had someone living alone who was 65 years of age or older. The average household size was 1.72 and the average family size was 2.25.

2.3% of the population were under the age of 18, 4.7% from 18 to 24, 25.6% from 25 to 44, 48.8% from 45 to 64, and 18.6% who were 65 years of age or older. The median age was 52 years. For every 100 females, there were 138.9 males. For every 100 females age 18 and over, there were 133.3 males.

The median household income was $18,125 and the median family income for was $19,375. Males had a median income of $26,250 compared with $13,750 for females. The per capita income for the plantation was $19,403. There were no families and 6.9% of the population living below the poverty line, including no under eighteens and 22.2% of those over 64.

References

External links
 Plantation of Lake View, Maine
 Three Rivers Community of Maine
 Schoodic Lake Webcams

Plantations in Piscataquis County, Maine
Plantations in Maine